"California" is a song by American rock band Phantom Planet. It was released as a single from their second album The Guest in February 2002.

The song was first heard on television on episode 8 of the television show Fastlane. Both the song and the band received major attention when it became the theme song on the Fox television show The O.C. It was also previously in the soundtrack to the film Orange County and featured on the episode "Milhouse of Sand and Fog" of The Simpsons.

The song is about driving on U.S. Route 101, traveling to see a concert. The song became a top ten hit in Austria, Italy, the United Kingdom, and Republic of Ireland, reaching number 3, number 2, number 9, and number 10 in the respective countries.

Song information 

The estates of Al Jolson and his songwriting team are co-credited for "California", presumably because the title and chorus bear strong resemblances to his own "California, Here I Come". Some websites refer to the Phantom Planet song as a cover of the Jolson tune. Some parts of the song, particularly the piano solos at the beginning and end, are similar to the Jolson song, but still contain several differences in melody. It also bears some thematic and melodic resemblance to Joni Mitchell's "California" from her 1971 album Blue.

The song was re-recorded in 2005 by Phantom Planet and re-released as "California 2005", a much mellower version of the song than the original. "California 2005" had its debut in the second episode of The O.C.s third season, and is featured on Music from the OC: MX-5.

Although normally this version of the song runs as the title song for The O.C., it was switched out for the Mates of State's cover version in a special episode where everything in the show took place in alternate universe, hence a different song for the title sequence.

The song is also featured in the 2005 documentary The Smartest Guys in the Room, which detailed the events leading to the collapse of Enron, including energy market manipulation in California.

 Track listing EPSingle'''

 Cover versions 

The song was covered in 2006 – again for The O.C., this time being covered by Mates of State for the sixth installment of the Music from The OC series. Canadian rapper k-os samples the song on a track called "I Wish I Knew Natalie Portman", from his album Yes! Alvin and the Chipmunks covered this song for their 2007 video game Alvin and the Chipmunks. 
In 2017, Lisa Mitchell covered the song for her When They Play That Song'' EP.

Charts

Weekly charts

Year-end charts

Certifications

References

2002 singles
The O.C.
Songs about California
2002 songs
Mark Ronson songs
Music videos directed by Roman Coppola
Song recordings produced by Mark Ronson
Songs written by Al Jolson
Song recordings produced by Tchad Blake
Song recordings produced by Mitchell Froom
Songs with lyrics by Buddy DeSylva
Phantom Planet songs
Television drama theme songs
Epic Records singles